Rachamalla II was an emperor of the Western Ganga dynasty.

Biography
Rachamalla II was an emperor of the Western Ganga dynasty whose minister was Chavundaraya.

See also 
 Vallimalai Jain caves

Notes

References
 

9th-century Indian monarchs
10th-century Indian monarchs
People of the Western Ganga dynasty
9th-century births

907 deaths
Year of birth unknown